Ismayil Shykhly (March 22, 1919 – July 26, 1995), also known by his birth name Ismayil Shikhlinsky Gahraman oglu, was an Azerbaijani writer.

Early years
Shykhly was born on March 22, 1919 in Ikinji Shykhly village of Qazakh Rayon of Azerbaijan. He studied in Kosalar village. In 1934, he enrolled in Qakhazh Pedagogical School. He was impressed by Samad Vurgun's poem "Yadıma düşdü" (I recollected) during his speech at Alexandr Pushkin's 100th anniversary celebrated in Qazakh.

The same year, Shykhly entered Baku State Pedagogical Institute. During his years in college, influenced by Vurgun's writing and Ashig folk art, he wrote many poems. His first poem "Quşlar" (Birds) was published in Ədəbiyyat qəzeti newspaper in 1938. He was a teacher by profession and wrote a number of books on ancient and national traditions. His most famous work, "Turbulent Kura" (Dəli Kür), was filmed in 1969 by Azerbaijanfilm.

On September 15, 1942 he volunteered for military service and fought in World War II through 1945.

Career
Upon his return, he continued writing. His first novel, Həkimin nağılı (The Doctor's tale), was published in 1947. 

From 1965 to 1968, he was the Chairman of Union of Azerbaijani Writers, and from 1976 to 1978, he was the Chief Editor of Azərbaycan magazine, From 1981 on, he was the First Secretary of the Union of Azerbaijani Writers. Shykhly had served as the deputy in Supreme Soviet of Azerbaijan SSR. He was awarded with Sheref, Red Banner of Labor and Shohrat orders for his contributions to Soviet and Azerbaijani literature.

Ismayil Shykhly died on July 26, 1995 in Baku. He was buried at Alley of Honor.

Memorial 
On January 28, 2019, Ilham Aliyev, the President of the Republic of Azerbaijan signed a decree on the celebration of the 100th anniversary of the birth of Ismayil Shykhly.

Works
 "My Dead World" (Ölən Dünyam)
 "Turbulent Kura" (Dəli Kür)
 "Bury the Dead in the Cemetery" (Ölüləri Qəbristanda basdirin)
 "Exile of Dignity" (Namus Qaçağı)
 "The Coward Bullet" (Namərd Gülləsı)

See also
Ali-Agha Shikhlinski

References

Soviet writers
Soviet poets
1919 births
1995 deaths
People from Qazax District
Recipients of the Sharaf Order
Recipients of the Shohrat Order
Azerbaijani writers
Azerbaijani poets
Soviet military personnel of World War II
Members of the Supreme Soviet of the Azerbaijan Soviet Socialist Republic
Shikhlinskis